AAFB  may refer to:
 Altus Air Force Base, Oklahoma, USA
 Andrews Air Force Base, Maryland, USA
 Andersen Air Force Base, Yigo, Guam
 Arnold Air Force Base, Tennessee, USA
 Eleuthera Auxiliary Air Force Base, Bahamas, see Eleuthera#Eleuthera AAFB